Adastocephalum is a genus of trilobite in the order Phacopida, which existed in what is now New South Wales, Australia. It was named by Mitchell in 1919, and the type species is Adastocephalum teleotypicum.

References

External links
 Adastocephalum at the Paleobiology Database

Trilobites of Australia
Phacopida genera